Bruce Lee, the Man and the Legend, also known as The Legend is Born of Bruce Lee and Year of the Dragon, is a 1973 Hong Kong documentary film, produced by Raymond Chow and starring Bruce Lee. A follow-up/reworking of this documentary was released in 1984 under the title Bruce Lee, The Legend.

Cast
 Bruce Lee 
 Nora Miao 
 Raymond Chow
 Betty Ting Pei
 Lee Hoi-chuen 
 Sammo Hung 
 Robert Wall 
 Hwang In-shik 
 Robert Clouse
 Casanova Wong
 Han Ying-chieh 
 Gig Young
 Hugh O'Brian
 Dan Inosanto
 Ji Han-Jae
 Jim Kelly
 Shih Kien
 Jackie Chan
 James Tien
 Fred Weintraub
 Chieh Yuan
 Lo Wei
 Tony Liu
 Unicorn Chan
 Linda Lee
 Chin Ti
 Lee Kwan
 Paul Wei Ping-ao
 Hwang Chung-shin
 Grace Ho
 Kim Tai-chung
 Ho Chung-tao

Scenes

References

External links
 

1973 films
Hong Kong documentary films
Concord Production Inc. films
Game of Death
1970s English-language films
1970s Hong Kong films